Hermanville may refer to the following places:

France
 Hermanville-sur-Mer, in Calvados, Basse-Normandie
 Hermanville, Seine-Maritime in Seine-Maritime, Haute-Normandie

United States
 Hermanville, Mississippi, in Claiborne County